Bykhovets or Bychowiec is a gender-neutral Slavic surname. Notable people with the surname include:

Aleksander Bychowiec, Russian-Polish noble and an amateur historian, author of Bychowiec Chronicle
Vassili Samarsky-Bykhovets (1803–1870), Russian mining engineer

Slavic-language surnames